Edward Kellogg may refer to:

Edward Kellogg (economist) (1790–1858), American economist and businessman
Edward Stanley Kellogg (1870–1948), 16th Governor of American Samoa
Edward W. Kellogg (1883–1960), American inventor